Ben Addelman (born 1977) is a Canadian filmmaker. He is known for directing four documentaries: Discordia, Bombay Calling, Nollywood Babylon, and Kivalina vs. Exxon. Besides directing, he is known for work as a cinematographer, screenwriter and sound designer.

Career
His first film Discordia (2004) co-directed with Samir Mallal follows three students during the aftermath of the Netenyahu Incident at Concordia University in Montreal in 2002.

His second film, Bombay Calling (2006) also co-directed with Samir Mallal follows the lives of telemarketers working outsourced jobs in a call center in Bombay (Mumbai), India.  Both films were produced by Adam Symansky from the National Film Board of Canada.

His third film, Nollywood Babylon (2008) with co-director Samir Mallal, a documentary co-produced with the National Film Board of Canada in association with the Documentary Channel is about the explosive popularity of Nigerian movies.

His fourth film, Kivalina v. Exxon (2011), follows the efforts of a small town in Alaska in a lawsuit against the oil and gas industries for climate change-related damages.

He has directed documentary television for Vice, Apple TV+, Disney+ and BBC. A recent Apple TV+ show that he was a director on is Becoming You.

Awards
In 2009, he was nominated with co-director Samir Mallal for "Best World Cinema - Documentary" award during 2009 Sundance Film Festival for the film Nollywood Babylon.
Won Best Documentary at the Whistler Film Festival in 2011 for Kivalina V. Exxon.

References

External links 
 
NFB page of Ben Addelman
Discordia
Bombay Calling
Nollywood Babylon

Canadian documentary film directors
Living people
Concordia University alumni
1977 births